Thilan (Sinhala: තිලාන්) is a Sinhalese masculine given name. It may refer to the following notable people:
Thilan Nimesh (born 1997), Sri Lankan cricketer
Thilan Prashan (born 1998), Sri Lankan cricketer
Thilan Samaraweera (born 1976), Sri Lankan cricketer
Thilan Thushara (born 1981), Sri Lankan cricketer
Thilan Walallawita (born 1998), English cricketer
Thilan Wijesinghe, Sri Lankan financier, entrepreneur, former cricketer and musician

Sinhalese masculine given names